The Tlicho language, also known as Tłı̨chǫ Yatıì or the Dogrib language, is a Northern Athabaskan language spoken by the Tłı̨chǫ (Dogrib people) First Nations of the Canadian Northwest Territories. According to Statistics Canada in 2011, there were 2,080 people who speak Tłı̨chǫ Yatıì. As of 2016, 1,735 people speak the language.

Tłıchǫ Yatıì is spoken by the Tłıchǫ, a Dene First Nations people that reside in the Northwest Territories of Canada. Tłı̨chǫ lands lie east of Mackenzie River (Deh Cho)  between  Great Slave Lake (Tıdeè) and Great Bear Lake (Sahtu) in the Northwest Territories. There are four primary communities that speak the language: Gamèti (formerly Rae Lakes), Behchokǫ̀ (formerly Rae-Edzo), Wekweètì (formerly Snare Lakes) and Whatì (formerly Lac La Martre). From a population number of about 800 during the mid-19th century to about 1,700 by the 1970s, the population has grown to about 2,080 as recorded by the 2011 Census. However, Tłıchǫ Yatıì has seen a decrease in mother tongue speakers, hence placing it under the list of endangered languages.

The Tłıchǫ region covers the northern shore of Great Slave Lake  (Tıdeè), reaching up to Great Bear Lake (Sahtu). Behchokǫ̀, is the largest community in Tłıchǫ territory. According to the Endangered Languages Project, approximately 1,350 people speak the language while at home. Speakers are commonly fluent in English.

History

Tłıchǫ Yatıì was traditionally only an oral language. Tłı̨chǫ Yatıì was one of the many Indigenous Canadian languages affected by the Canadian Indian residential school system. Through the British North America Act of 1867 and the Indian Act of 1876, the Canadian Government formalised its unilateral  control over Indigenous people and their lands. By the 1920s these schools became mandatory for all indigenous children to attend. Indigenous languages were not allowed to be spoken at these schools since the late 19th century. The last of the residential schools closed in 1996. These schools contributed heavily to language shift away from Indigenous languages, including Tłı̨chǫ Yatıì, and towards English.

In 1992, the first edition of the Tłıchǫ Yatıì Enįhtł’è - A Dogrib Dictionary was published which provided the Tłıchǫ people with a database of words and spelling. This sparked the interest of community members and became the first step in revitalization efforts.

Revitalization efforts 
In 2005, the Tłıchǫ signed the Tłıchǫ Agreement for Self-Governance. This allowed the Tłıchǫ people to prioritize the preservation of their language, culture and way of life. Since its implementation, the Tłıchǫ Government has been working hard to help younger generations of Tłıchǫ learn the language by declaring Tłıchǫ Yatıì as one of two official languages of the Tłıchǫ Government. Revitalization efforts include putting up signs in Tłıchǫ Yatıì, creating on the land programs, providing Tłıchǫ Yatıì classes for community members.

Tłı̨chǫ Yatıì is one of the nine official Indigenous languages of the Northwest Territories (NWT) in Canada. Because of its official status, the NWT's department of Education, Culture, and Employment, has been monitoring the language through the Indigenous Languages and Education Secretariat since 2014. This department is devoted to the revitalization of the official languages in the NWT and has policies that ensure the continued use and growth of Indigenous languages. According to the 2018 - 2019 Annual Report on Official Languages, multiple revitalization efforts have been made by the Tłı̨chǫ Government. Some of which include an Elder Evening Story Telling that occurs weekly, transcribing and translating materials into Tłı̨chǫ Yatıì for classes, setting up a radio station, and having community language classes in the language, now including immersion classes in grades K-7. In addition to local efforts, the Official Languages Act ensures that Tłı̨chǫ Yatıì and the other indigenous languages are used in providing government services.

Geographic distribution

The language is mainly spoken in the Northwest Territories of Canada. The four official Tłıchǫ communities are Gamètì, Behchokǫ̀, Wekweètì and Whatì. Both communities of Yellowknife and Dettah also have many Tłıchǫ speakers, mostly speaking the Wıı̀lıı̀deh Yatıı̀ dialect.

Dialects
The Yellowknives Dene speak a dialect of Tłı̨chǫ called Wıı̀lıı̀deh Yatıı̀. This dialect came into existence when speakers of Chipewyan began speaking Tłı̨chǫ after 1829 and incorporated some Chipewyan words and grammar.

Phonology

Consonants
The consonants of Tłıchǫ Yatıì in the standard orthography are listed below (with IPA notation in brackets):

Tenuis stops may be lightly voiced. Aspirated stops may be fricated  before back vowels.

Vowels
The language uses long, short and nasal vowels, and distinguishes them in writing, along with low tone:

 Nasal vowels are marked by an ogonek (called wı̨ghǫą, 'its little nose', in Tłı̨chǫ Yatıı̀) e.g. ą.
 Low tone is marked with a grave accent (called wets'aà, 'its hat', in Tłı̨chǫ Yatıı̀), e.g. à.
 High tone is never marked.
 The letter 'i' is written without a dot (tittle).

Grammar

Typologically, Tłıchǫ Yatıì is an agglutinating, polysynthetic head-marking language, but many of its affixes combine into contractions more like fusional languages. The canonical word order of Tłıchǫ Yatıì is SOV. Tłıchǫ Yatıì words are modified primarily by prefixes, which is unusual for an SOV language (suffixes are expected).

Like Spanish and Portuguese, Tłıchǫ Yatıì has two verbs similar to English 'be'. One is used for ways of being that are more dynamic or temporary; the other for more permanent and immutable properties. For example, nàzèe-dǫǫ̀ ts’ı̨ı̨lı̨ and nàzèe-dǫǫ̀ ats’ı̨ı̨t’e both mean 'we are hunters', but the first means that the speakers are currently hunters (for example, part of a hunting party), while the second implies that hunting is their regular profession.

In addition to verbs and nouns, there are pronouns, clitics of various functions, demonstratives, numerals, postpositions, adverbs, and conjunctions in Tłıchǫ. The class of adjectives is very small, probably around two dozen words:  most descriptive words are verbs rather than adjectives.

Examples 
Example words and phrases:

  – Tłıchǫ people
  – dog
  – dog rib
  – fish
  – duck
  – egg
  – milk
  – wolf
  – poplar
  – river
  – canoe
  – island
  – rock
  or  – mount
  – lake
  – snow
  or  – rain
  – smoke
  – house
  – white
  – black
  – red
  – strong like two people

See also

 Languages of Canada
 Indigenous languages of the Americas

References

External links 

 Alphabet and pronunciation at Omniglot
 Tłı̨chǫ Yatıì Multimedia Dictionary
 Dictionaries and Tłıchǫ language sources in PDF format
 Dogrib basic lexicon at the Global Lexicostatistical Database
 

First Nations in the Northwest Territories
First Nations languages in Canada
Indigenous languages of the North American Subarctic
Northern Athabaskan languages
Tłı̨chǫ